New Zuari Bridge, also commonly known as Manohar Setu, is a toll bridge over the Zuari River in Goa, India, linking the  districts of North Goa and South Goa.

Named after the Zuari River, the project was under the control of National Highways Authority of India (NHAI).

History 
The foundation stone of the bridge was laid in 2016. It was initially agreed that it would take three years to complete. Bhopal based Dilip Buildcon Limited was awarded the bridge construction project. Work on the country's second largest cable bridge started in collaboration with a Ukrainian firm. But the work progressed slowly. The construction of the bridge, which was supposed to be completed in 2021, was delayed due to the Covid-19 pandemic; because the pandemic situation prevented DBL's Chinese consultant from traveling to India. Union Road Transport and Highways Minister Nitin Gadkari inaugurated the first phase of the New Juari Bridge in Goa on 29 December 2022. According to the construction company, the construction of this bridge will be completed by April 2023.

Architectural features 

See also 
 Atal Setu, Goa
 Zuari Bridge

References 

Bridges in Goa
Buildings and structures in North Goa district
Buildings and structures in South Goa district
Transport in Panaji
Cable-stayed bridges in India
Toll bridges in India
Bridges completed in 2022